The 1910–11 NCAA men's basketball season began in December 1910, progressed through the regular season, and concluded in March 1911.

Season headlines 

 The Intercollegiate Athletic Association of the United States (IAAUS) renamed itself the National Collegiate Athletic Association (NCAA) in 1910 prior to the 1910–11 basketball season.
 After a two-season hiatus and a reorganization, the Eastern Intercollegiate Basketball League resumed conference play, with five members.
 The Rocky Mountain Athletic Conference began play, with four original members.
 In February 1943, the Helms Athletic Foundation retroactively selected St. John's as its national champion for the 1910–11 season.
 In 1995, the Premo-Porretta Power Poll retroactively selected St. John's as its national champion for the 1910–11 season.

Conference membership changes

NOTE: Although Colorado College joined the Rocky Mountain Athletic Conference for the 1910–11 season, it did not field its first major-level basketball team until the 1913–14 season.

Regular season

Conference winners

Statistical leaders

Awards

Helms College Basketball All-Americans 

The practice of selecting a Consensus All-American Team did not begin until the 1928–29 season. The Helms Athletic Foundation later retroactively selected a list of All-Americans for the 1910–11 season.

Major player of the year awards 

 Helms Player of the Year: Ted Kiendl, Columbia (retroactive selection in 1944)

Coaching changes 

A number of teams changed coaches during the season and after it ended.

References